Tobias Kjell Bertil Krantz (born 7 April 1971) is a Swedish politician of the Liberal People's Party. He served as Minister for Higher Education and Research in the Swedish government between 17 June 2009 and 5 October 2010.

Education 
Tobias Krantz grew up in Bankeryd, Jönköping Municipality, Sweden. He earned a B.A. in politics, economics, history and French from Uppsala University in 1995. From 1995 to 2002 he was a Ph.D student and lecturer in political science at Uppsala University. His Ph.D. thesis, published in 2002, was titled The power over the region. A critical study of the debate about Swedish regions from 1963 to 1996.

Political career 
Krantz served as vice president of the Liberal Youth of Sweden from 1996 to 1999. He also worked as an editorial writer for Upsala Nya Tidning from 1994 to 1999. He was a member of the Liberal People's Party's committee on higher education from 2000 to 2001, and worked as chief analyst for the party from 2001 to 2002.

Krantz has served as a Member of Parliament since the 2006 election. In the parliament he was a member of the Committee on the Constitution and the War Delegation from 2002 to 2006. Since 2006 he is a member of the Committee on Health and Welfare and a deputy member of the Committee on Civil Affairs, Committee on Cultural Affairs, Committee on Social Insurance and the Committee on European Union Affairs. He is also a member of the board of the Liberal People's Party and a deputy member of board of Riksrevisionen.

Following Lars Leijonborg's decision to step down from the Swedish government, Krantz was appointed as new Minister for Higher Education and Research on 17 June 2009. Krantz left the government on 5 October 2010, following the 2010 election.

In 2016, he was appointed chairman of the Board of World Skills Sweden AB.

In 2017, he was elected chairman of the Board of WaterAid Sweden. Krantz is also a member of the board of this organization. Krantz is also a member of the board of Örebro University 2016–2017, a member of the 2015 school commission 2015–2017 and a member of the board of the research institute Ratio 2012–2017.

Personal life 
Tobias Krantz is married to Anna Grönlund Krantz, also a Liberal People's Party politician, with whom he has one child.

References

External links

Tobias Krantz at the Swedish government's website 
Tobias Krantz at the Swedish parliament's website 
Tobias Krantz at the Liberal People's Party's website 
Tobias Krant, official blog

1971 births
Higher education ministers of Sweden
Living people
Members of the Riksdag 2002–2006
Members of the Riksdag 2006–2010
Members of the Riksdag from the Liberals (Sweden)
People from Jönköping
Swedish bloggers
Swedish political scientists
Uppsala University alumni